Olga Ertlova, (born January 10, 1986, in Klatovy) is a professional squash player who represents Czech Republic. She reached a career-high world ranking of World No. 43 in January 2014.

References

External links 

Czech female squash players
Living people
1986 births
People from Klatovy
Sportspeople from the Plzeň Region